Jean Nakouzi (born 19 May 1947) is a Lebanese wrestler. He competed in the men's Greco-Roman 57 kg at the 1968 Summer Olympics.

References

External links
 

1947 births
Living people
Lebanese male sport wrestlers
Olympic wrestlers of Lebanon
Wrestlers at the 1968 Summer Olympics
Sportspeople from Beirut
20th-century Lebanese people